Autoroute 730 (A-730) is an autoroute located in the region of Montérégie, Quebec, Canada, and is freeway spur of Autoroute 30. Originally opened in 1992, it was part of Autoroute 30 until November 19, 2010, when A-30 was realigned, resulting in the bypassed section becoming a collector highway.

Exit list
From south to north; old exit numbers are former A-30 exit numbers.

References

External links
 Transports Quebec Map 
 A-730 at motorways-exits.com

730